The 1943–44 season saw Rochdale compete for their 5th season in the wartime league (League North). The season was split into 2 championships. In the 1st Championship, Rochdale finished in 13th position out of 50, and in the 2nd Championship, they finished 24th out of 50. Some matches in the 2nd Championship were also in the League War Cup and Lancashire Cup.

Statistics
												

|}

Competitions

Football League North & War League Cup

References

Rochdale A.F.C. seasons
Rochdale